Nick Kyrgios and Jack Sock were the defending champions, but chose not to participate this year.

Ivan Dodig and Édouard Roger-Vasselin won the title, defeating Ken and Neal Skupski in the final, 6–4, 6–3.

Seeds

Draw

Draw

References

External links
 Main Draw

2019 ATP Tour
2019 Doubles
2019 in French tennis